Myron Shongwe (born 6 May 1981 in Soweto, Gauteng) is a South African football player who played as a striker, among others for MP Black Aces in the National First Division. He has represented the South Africa Development XI, playing for them at the 2011 African Championship of Nations.

Previous clubs include AmaZulu, Black Leopards, City Pillars

References

External links

1981 births
Living people
South African soccer players
Association football forwards
Sportspeople from Soweto
Black Leopards F.C. players
AmaZulu F.C. players
Mpumalanga Black Aces F.C. players
Jomo Cosmos F.C. players
2011 African Nations Championship players
South Africa A' international soccer players